Aubrieta (often misspelled as Aubretia) is a genus of about 20 species of flowering plants in the cabbage family Brassicaceae. The genus is named after Claude Aubriet, a French flower painter. It originates from southern Europe east to central Asia but is now a common garden escape throughout Europe. It is a low, spreading plant, hardy, evergreen and perennial. It has small violet, pink, or white flowers, and it inhabits rocks and banks. It prefers light, well-drained soil, is tolerant of a wide pH range, and can grow in partial shade or full sun.

Species
 Aubrieta anamasica
 Aubrieta alba
 Aubrieta canescens
 Aubrieta canescens subsp. cilicica
 Aubrieta columnae
 Aubrieta columnae subsp. croatica
 Aubrieta columnae subsp. pirinaca
 Aubrieta deltoidea
 Aubrieta erubescens
 Aubrieta edentula
 Aubrieta glabrescens
 Aubrieta gracilis
 Aubrieta x hybrida
 Aubrieta libanotica
 Aubrieta olympica
 Aubrieta parviflora
 Aubrieta pinardii
 Aubrieta scardica
 Aubrieta scyria
 Aubrieta thessala
 Aubrieta vulcanica
+35 synonymous species

Cultivars
The following cultivars, of mixed or uncertain parentage, are recipients of the Royal Horticultural Society's Award of Garden Merit:-
'Argenteovariegata'  
'Aureovariegata'
'Doctor Mules' 
'Red Cascade'

References

Brassicaceae
Brassicaceae genera
Garden plants of Asia
Garden plants of Europe
Taxa named by Michel Adanson